Ignacio Martín Llorente (born 1 July 1969) is an entrepreneur, researcher and educator in the field of cloud and distributed computing. He is the director of OpenNebula, a visiting scholar at Harvard University and a full professor at Complutense University.

Llorente graduated in physics, with a major in computer science in 1992. He obtained his Ph.D. in physics, with a specialty in computer science in 1995 at the Complutense University of Madrid. Later in 2003, he received an Executive MBA degree from IE Business School. After finishing his Ph.D. on efficient execution of scientific applications on parallel computers, he worked on parallel systems with different scaling models. Llorente was promoted to associate professor at the Complutense University of Madrid in 1997. From 1997 to 2002, he held consultancy positions at the Institute for Computer Applications in Science and Engineering at the NASA Langley Research Center, where he conducted research on multi-grid methods, their application to computational fluid dynamics, and their parallel implementation.

Since 2002, Llorente led the Distributed Systems Architecture Research Group in large-scale distributed infrastructures, virtualization technologies, distributed computing, and resource provision platforms. Supporting projects including the EU-funded RESERVOIR project. He has focused his research on architectures, meta-scheduling and benchmarking for grid computing, as well as cloud computing architectures and federation. These efforts have resulted in several open-source technologies, such as Globus, GridWay, and OpenNebula. Later, in 2010, he co-founded C12G Labs, a cloud computing technology start-up which leads OpenNebula development.

Llorente was promoted to full professor in 2006. From 2002 to 2007, he also held a senior researcher position in the Advanced Computing Lab at CAB (CSIC/INTA center associated to NASA Astrobiology Institute). In 2009, Llorente co-founded and co-chaired the Open Grid Forum Working Group on the Open Cloud Computing Interface. Since 2009, he participated in the European Cloud Computing Group of Experts.

Llorente received the ARITMEL 2020 Computer Science Award for his contributions to cloud computing.

References

External links
 Personal web page
 CloudBook Profile of Ignacio M. Llorente
 The Next Generation of Cloud Computing Platforms, An Interview with Ignacio M. Llorente, Science, Technology and Innovation Projects, August 2010.
 Cloudview: An Interview with Dr. Ignacio M. Llorente, HPC in the Cloud, May 2010

Living people
Researchers in distributed computing
Spanish computer scientists
1969 births